Diego Muñoz Erenchun (Santiago de Chile, February 11, 1976) is a Chilean actor of film, television and theatre. He is also creative director of the fiction area of Centro Mori.

Biography 
He studied at Saint George's College until II ° Medio, later finishing his studies at Colegio Francisco de Asís de Las Condes. He has maintained a close relationship of friendship since this time with fellow actors Nicolás Saavedra and Mariana Loyola.

Graduated from the Fernando González Theater School, where he was a partner of Gonzalo Valenzuela, another great friend of the actor.

In 1998 he made his debut in the television series Borrón y cuenta nueva, on Televisión Nacional de Chile. Later he participated in other dramatic productions on Channel 13. He established himself as an actor and heartthrob in the television series Machos. 

At the same time, he has participated in various films including Sábado y Malta con Huevo, and theatrical productions.

He played José Antonio Pérez Cotapos, in the series Héroes (Channel 13, 2007). 
In 2010 he starred in the TVN production, Martín Rivas. 

In his theatrical work he has acted in plays such as "Games at siesta time" and directed in Are you there? in 2008.

During the 2010s he had supporting roles in four Pablo Larraín's films; No, El club, Neruda, and  Ema.

Filmography

Films

Telenovelas

Series and unitaries 
 2002: Más que Amigos as Rodrigo Osorio
 2007: Héroes as José Antonio Pérez Cotapos
 2013: Prófugos as Gabriel Villalobos
 2020: La jauría, as Marco Valdés

References 

1976 births
Living people
Chilean television actors
Chilean film actors
People from Santiago
Actors from Santiago
20th-century Chilean actors
21st-century Chilean actors